Antti Ilmari Aarnio-Wihuri (born 24 February 1940 in Turku) is a Finnish billionaire businessman. He heads the Wihuri Group, a Finnish diversified conglomerate that has been in existence for over 100 years. It employs over 5,000, and is involved in the industries of packaging, food distribution, aviation and construction equipment retail, private jet charter, and ambulance services. He himself is the largest single shareholder in the Canadian packaging company Winpak.

Aarnio-Wihuri is also known as a former race driver and team principal. With Leo Kinnunen, the AAW Racing Team won the Interserie three times in the early 1970s. Aarnio-Wihuri has later supported young drivers such as Valtteri Bottas.

Results at track

References

Finnish businesspeople
Finnish billionaires
1940 births
Living people